The Ampera Cabinet was the Indonesian Cabinet which served under President Sukarno and later on, Acting President Suharto from July 1966 until October 1967. The Cabinet was formed after the Provisional People's Consultative Assembly (MPRS) session of 1966 which commissioned Suharto to form a new Cabinet. Although Sukarno would not be removed from the Presidency for some months, for all intents and purposes, the person who was truly in charge of the Cabinet and Indonesia by this point was Suharto.

President 
President: Sukarno

Cabinet Presidium 
Chairman/Chief Minister of Defense and Security/Commander of the Army: Lt. Gen. Suharto
Chief Minister of Political Affairs/Minister of Foreign Affairs: Adam Malik
Chief Minister of People's Welfare: Idham Chalid
Chief Minister of Economics and Finance: Hamengkubuwono IX
Chief Minister of Industry and Development: Sanusi Hardjadinata

Ministers in the Field of Defense and Security 
Commander of the Navy: Rear Admiral Muljadi
Commander of the Air Force: Air Marshal Rusmin Nurjadin
Chief of Police: Police Gen. Sucipto Judodiharjo
Minister of Veterans Affairs and Demobilization: Maj. Gen. Sarbini

Ministers in the Field of Political Affairs 
Minister of Home Affairs: Maj. Gen. Basuki Rahmat
Minister of Justice: Umar Seno Adji
Minister of Information: B. M. Diah

Ministers in the Field of People's Welfare 
Minister of Education and Culture: Sarino Mangunpranoto
Minister of Religious Affairs: Sjaifuddin Zuchri
Minister of Social Affairs: Albert Mangaratua Tambunan
Minister of Health: G. A. Siwabessy
Minister of Manpower: Brig. Gen. Awaluddin Djamin

Ministers in the Field of Economics and Finance 
Minister of Trade: Maj. Gen. Ashari Danudirjo
Minister of Finance: Frans Seda
Minister of Transportation: Air Commodore Sutopo
Minister of Maritime Affairs: Rear Admiral Jatidjan
Minister of Agriculture: Brig. Gen. Sutjipto
Minister of Plantations: P. C. Hardjasudirja

Ministers in the Field of Industry and Development 
Minister of Basic Industries, Light Industries, and Energy: Maj. Gen. M Jusuf
Minister of Textile and Handicraft Industries: Sanusi
Minister of Mines: Slamet Bratanata
Minister of Public Works: Sutami

Changes 
12 March 1967: Sukarno was dismissed from the Presidency by the MPRS. He was replaced by Suharto who assumed the office of Acting President.

References

Notes

External links 
 Indonesian Cabinets Page on Indonesian Embassy in UK

Transition to the New Order
Cabinets of Indonesia
1966 establishments in Indonesia
1967 disestablishments in Indonesia
Cabinets established in 1966
Cabinets disestablished in 1967